Hazvinei Sharyce Saili (born 2 September 1982) is a Zimbabwean woman cricketer. She represented Zimbabwe at the 2013 ICC Women's World Twenty20 Qualifier. In the 2013 ICC Women's World Cup Qualifier, she was the second joint wicket taker in the tournament along with Leonie Bennett (7 wickets).

References

External links 
 Profile at Cricket Archive

1982 births
Living people
Zimbabwean women cricketers